Omission may refer to:
Omission (Catholicism), a type of sin
Omission (law), a failure to act, with legal consequences
Omission bias, a tendency to favor inaction over action
Purposeful omission, a literary method
Theory of omission, a writing technique
The Omission, a 2018 Argentine film
Selective omission, an effort to forget traumatic memories
Lying by omission